Events in the year 1954 in Mexico.

Incumbents

Federal government
 President: Adolfo Ruiz Cortines
 Interior Secretary (SEGOB): Ángel Carvajal Bernal
 Secretary of Foreign Affairs (SRE): Luis Padilla Nervo
 Communications Secretary (SCT): Carlos Lazo
 Education Secretary (SEP):  Jose Angel Ceniceros
 Secretary of Defense (SEDENA): Matías Ramos 
 Secretary of Navy: Rodolfo Sánchez Taboada
 Secretary of Labor and Social Welfare: Adolfo López Mateos

Supreme Court

 President of the Supreme Court: José María Ortiz Tirado

Governors
Every governor was a member of the Institutional Revolutionary Party (PRI)

 Aguascalientes: Benito Palomino Dena
 Baja California: Braulio Maldonado Sandez
 Campeche: Manuel López Hernández
 Chiapas: Efraín Aranda Osorio
 Chihuahua: Oscar Soto Maynez
 Coahuila: Ramón Cepeda López
 Colima: Jesús González Lugo
 Durango: Enrique Torres Sánchez
 Guanajuato: José Aguilar y Maya
 Guerrero: Alejandro Gómez Maganda/Darío L. Arrieta Mateos
 Hidalgo: Quintín Rueda Villagrán
 Jalisco: Agustín Yáñez
 State of Mexico: Salvador Sánchez Colín
 Michoacán: Dámaso Cárdenas del Río
 Morelos: Rodolfo López de Nava
 Nayarit: José Limón Guzmán
 Nuevo León: José S. Vivanco
 Oaxaca: Manuel Cabrera Carrasqueado/Manuel I. Manjardín/José Pacheco Iturribarría
 Puebla: Rafael Ávila Camacho
 Querétaro: Octavio Mondragón Guerra/Juan C. Gorraéz
 San Luis Potosí: Ismael Salas Penieres/Manuel Álvarez
 Sinaloa: Rigoberto Aguilar Pico 
 Sonora: Ignacio Soto/Álvaro Obregón Tapia
 Tabasco: Manuel Bartlett Bautista/Miguel Orrico de los Llanos
 Tamaulipas: Horacio Terán
 Tlaxcala: Felipe Mazarraza	 
 Veracruz: Marco Antonio Muñoz Turnbull
 Yucatán: Víctor Mena Palomo
 Zacatecas: José Minero Roque
Regent of the Federal District: Ernesto P. Uruchurtu

Events

 The Museo Regional de la Ceramica, Tlaquepaque is established in Tlaquepaque, Jalisco.
 The Confederación Revolucionaria de Trabajadores is founded. 
 June 24/26: Hurricane Alice (June 1954)
 December 8: The Autonomous University of Chihuahua is founded.

Awards
Belisario Domínguez Medal of Honor – Rosaura Zapata and  Erasmo Castellanos Quinto

Film

 List of Mexican films of 1954.

Sport

 1953–54 Mexican Primera División season.
 1954 Carrera Panamericana. 
 The 1954 Central American and Caribbean Games are held in Mexico City.
 The United States defeat Mexico in the Americas Zone final of the Davis Cup.
  The Tecolotes de Nuevo Laredo win the Mexican League.
 February 7: Club Celaya is founded.
 August 28: Club Universidad Nacional is founded.

Births
January 26
Sebastián Ligarde, Mexican-American actor
Jorge Hernández Andrés, businessman and bullfighter (d. 2018).
February 20 — Jorge Torres López, politician (PRI) and Governor of Coahuila in 2011
May 13 — Alejandro Encinas Rodríguez, politician (PRD) and Mayor of Mexico City 2005-2006
June 24 – Juan González Gómez ("Juan Cotz"), painter from San Juan Chamula, Chiapas (d. 2017).
June 28 — Mario Plutarco Marín Torres, Governor of Puebla 2005-2011
July 11 — Alejandro Camacho, actor and producer
July 26 — Leonardo Daniel, actor and director
September 2 — Humberto Zurita, actor, director, and producer.
October 17 – Herón Escobar, politician (PT), deputy (2009-2012); (d. October 24, 2016).
November 3 – Carlos Girón, silver medal-winning diver in the 1980 Olympics. (d. January 13, 2020)
Date unknown

Deaths
 March 30: Agustín Aragón León politician and philosopher (b. 1870)

References

 
Mexico